Dunmore Abbey is a medieval Augustinian friary and National Monument located in County Galway, Ireland.

Location

Dunmore Friary is located in the northern part of Dunmore, County Galway.

History
Dunmore was an early monastic site, allegedly founded by Saint Patrick in the 5th century.

The site was founded for the Augustinian friars before 1425 by Walter de Bermingham, Baron Athenry.

Dunmore Abbey was dissolved in 1569, but the friars remained in occupancy. After the Reformation part of the friary was converted into a parish church of the Church of Ireland.

In 1574 the land was held by John Fitz-Thomas Burke.

In 1641 there were still a prior and thirty friars in the community. The friars left in 1645, taking refuge at Mayfield.

In 1698 a comprehensive inventory was made.

Buildings

There is a fine and decorative 15th century west doorway.

References

Augustinian monasteries in the Republic of Ireland
Religion in County Galway
Archaeological sites in County Galway
National Monuments in County Galway